Masaki Maki (真木 将樹, born  February 13, 1976 in Kitakyushu) is a Japanese former professional baseball pitcher in Japan's Nippon Professional Baseball. He played with the Osaka Kintetsu Buffaloes from 1998 to 2001. He also played for the Calgary Outlaws in the Canadian Baseball League in 2003.

External links

1976 births
Living people
Baseball people from Fukuoka Prefecture
Japanese baseball players
Nippon Professional Baseball pitchers
Osaka Kintetsu Buffaloes players
Calgary Outlaws players